Hawaii, Oslo is a 2004 Norwegian drama film, directed by Erik Poppe with a screenplay by Harald Rosenløw Eeg. It stars Trond Espen Seim, Aksel Hennie, Jan Gunnar Røise and Petronella Barker.

The film's music was composed by John Erik Kaada and Bugge Wesseltoft. Produced by Finn Gjerdrum and distributed by Paradox Spillefilm, the film is in the Norwegian language and was edited by Arthur Coburn.

Production
The film was shot in Oslo, Norway, with an estimated budget of NOK 20,000,000.

Plot
Vidar (Seim), who works at a psychiatric hospital, tries to keep himself awake as much as he can, because he has several times dreamt of horrible events that turned out to be true premonitions. At one point, he dreams that Leon (Røise), one of the patients, who is supposed to meet his ex-girlfriend, never meets her, but is hit by an ambulance instead.

Release and reception 
The film was released on 24 September 2004 and was generally well received by the Norwegian press. Dagbladet gave the film five out of six points, and called it an "intense cinematic experience". Aftenposten awarded six out of six points, claiming the movie expanded the boundaries of Norwegian film. Verdens Gang also gave the film six out of six points.

Awards
The film was awarded two Amanda Awards in 2005"Best Film (Norwegian)" and "Best Screenplay". It was also nominated in the categories "Best Director" and "Best Actor" (Stig Henrik Hoff).

Cast

 Trond Espen Seim as Vidar
 Jan Gunnar Røise as Leon
 Evy Kasseth Røsten as Åsa
 Stig Henrik Hoff as Frode
 Silje Torp Færavaag as Milla
 Robert Skjærstad as Viggo
 Petronella Barker as Bobbie
 Bejamin Røsler as Mikkel
 Ferdinand Falsen-Hiis as Magne
 Judith Darko as Tina
 Aksel Hennie as Trygve
 Morten Faldaas as John

See also

 2004 in film
 Cinema of Norway
 List of Amanda Award winners
 List of drama films
 Norwegian films of the 2000s

References

External links

2004 films
2004 drama films
Films set in Oslo
Films shot in Norway
2000s Norwegian-language films
Films directed by Erik Poppe
Films scored by John Erik Kaada
Hyperlink films
Norwegian drama films